Robert "Bob" Isaac Lee (August 16, 1956 – October 20, 2004) was a Chinese-American actor.

Robert was born Robert Alexander Isaac Lee in Gansu, China; he and his family had emigrated from China to the United States when Lee was 8 years old, moving to Sacramento, California.

Lee married Jenny Anne Wong on September 5, 1989. They had 3 children together: 1 son born 1990, a daughter in 1992 and a second son in 1994. 

Lee died on October 20, 2004, in Phoenix, Arizona at the age of 48. His cause of death was noted as a heart attack.

Filmography
The Big Empty (2005) - Eskimo
Soul Plane (2004) - Judge Pong
Arrested Development (2003) (TV series) - Worker #1
The X Files Game (1998) (VG) - James Wong
Sliders (1995) (TV series) - FBI Agent Harold Yen
The Vortex: Quantum Gate II (1994) (VG) (as Robert I. Lee) - Aylinde tribe leader
Harry and the Hendersons (1987) - Kim Lee
Trouble in Mind (1985) (as Robert Lee) - Ho
The Rape of Richard Beck (1985) (TV) - Lew

External links
 

1956 births
2004 deaths
20th-century American male actors
American male film actors
American male television actors
American people of Chinese descent
Chinese emigrants to the United States
Male actors from Gansu
Male actors from Sacramento, California